Ruine may refer to:

Alter Der Ruine, a power noise group from Tucson, Arizona
La Grande Ruine (3,765 m), a mountain in the French Alps, in the Massif des Écrins
Of Ruine or Some Blazing Starre, an album by English band Current 93

A number of castles in Austria and Germany are designated "Ruine":
Ruine Diepoldsburg, a castle in Baden-Wuerttemberg
Ruine Hauenstein, a castle in Styria, Austria
Ruine Henneberg, a castle in Styria, Austria
Ruine Hohenwang, a castle in Styria, Austria
Ruine Kalsberg, a castle in Styria, Austria
Ruine Katsch, a castle in Styria, Austria
Ruine Klöch, a castle in Styria, Austria
Ruine Liechtenstein, a castle in Styria, Austria
Ruine Ligist, a castle in Styria, Austria
Ruine Neudeck, a castle in Styria, Austria
Ruine Neu-Leonroth, a castle in Styria, Austria
Ruine Nollig, a ruined castle above the village of Lorch in Hesse, Germany
Ruine Offenburg, a castle in Styria, Austria
Ruine Pernegg, a castle in Styria, Austria
Ruine Pflindsberg, a castle in Styria, Austria
Ruine Puxer-Loch, a castle in Styria, Austria
Ruine Raabeck, a castle in Styria, Austria
Ruine Schmirnberg, a castle in Styria, Austria

nl:Ruine